Pterostylis oblonga, commonly known as the coastal maroonhood, is a species of orchid endemic to New South Wales where it grows on the coast and tablelands. Both flowering  and non-flowering plants have a rosette of dark green leaves lying flat on the ground. Flowering plants have a relatively small greenish brown and white flower which has darker brown tips.

Description
Pterostylis oblonga is a terrestrial, perennial, deciduous herb with an underground tuber. The dorsal sepal and petals are fused, forming a hood or "galea" over the column, the galea with a dark brown tip. There is a wide gap between the petals and the lateral sepals and the sinus between the lateral sepals has a central notch and curves slightly forward. Flowering occurs from July to September.

Taxonomy and naming
Pterostylis oblonga was first formally described in 2006 by David Jones from a specimen collected near Bawley Point and the description was published in the journal Australian Orchid Research. The specific epithet (oblonga) is a Latin word meaning "longer than broad".

Distribution and habitat
The coastal maroonhood grows mainly in coastal and near coastal forest between Coffs Harbour and Nowra.

References

oblonga
Orchids of New South Wales
Plants described in 2006